is a 2000 PlayStation adventure video game developed by Sony Computer Entertainment. It was released only in Japan.

The game is set on a mountain after a plane crash, and allows for the switching between characters. It received a full English language fan translation in 2022.

Plot

The setting of the game is in the fictional country of Meruza – which was named after the actual Argentine province Mendoza; the country is currently undergoing political turmoil as the result of an independence movement. The movement has split Argentina in half, and a 33-year-old activist named Pachamama goes on a flight as part of a politically motivated independence tour. During the flight, a terrorist detonates a time bomb, which causes the plane to crash near Aconcagua's peak; only five passengers survive the crash.

Gameplay

In Aconcagua, the player controls a Japanese journalist named Kato, whose job, along with Pachamama's, is to guide the survivors safely down the mountain. The game is organized in a series of missions in which the player must complete from a third-person perspective. During the descent, the terrorists, knowing their plot failed, try to eliminate the survivors via helicopter drops. It also involves various problem-solving and survival skills while using items left behind from the downed plane. The game features over 80 minutes of cinematic cutscenes to advance the plot. It also features multiple outcomes and endings, both of which depend on the choices the player makes during the game.

Aconcagua has been compared to Chase the Express, as well as Dino Crisis, Parasite Eve and the Resident Evil series. However, its gameplay and structure more closely resembles point-and-click adventure games.

Development 
According to IGN, Sony was attempting to penetrate the Argentine video game market with this title, while GameSpot said that they timed the release on the advent of the PlayStation 2 launch in order to boost PS1 sales.

Release 
The game was released in Japan on June 1, 2000. The game was previewed on Sony's website, which showed trailers that featured English dialogue. Aconcagua was set to be released in North America sometime in late 2000, but it was never released there.

Reception

The Japanese game magazine Famitsu gave the game a score of 29 out of 40.

German magazine Video Games gave it a score of 70%.

References

2000 video games
Aviation accidents and incidents in fiction
2000s horror video games
Japan-exclusive video games
PlayStation (console) games
PlayStation (console)-only games
Survival video games
Video games about terrorism
Video games developed in Japan
Video games set in Argentina
Sony Interactive Entertainment games
Single-player video games